Erik van Rossem (born 12 October 1938) is a Dutch field hockey player. He competed in the men's tournament at the 1964 Summer Olympics.

References

External links
 

1938 births
Living people
Dutch male field hockey players
Olympic field hockey players of the Netherlands
Field hockey players at the 1964 Summer Olympics
Sportspeople from Rotterdam
20th-century Dutch people